Extermination (stylized ExtermiNation) is the thirteenth studio album by British heavy metal band Raven. It was released on 28 April 2015 by Steamhammer.

Track listing
 "Intro/Destroy All Monsters" – 6:04
 "Tomorrow" – 4:24
 "It's Not What You Got" – 3:26
 "Fight" – 4:00
 "Battle March/Tank Treads (The Blood Runs Red)" – 5:23
 "Feeding the Monster" – 3:40
 "Fire Burns Within" – 4:55
 "Scream" – 3:01
 "One More Day" – 5:10
 "Thunder Down Under" – 4:46
 "No Surrender" – 3:50
 "Golden Dawn" – 0:53
 "Silver Bullet" – 4:12
 "River of No Return" – 5:22
 "Malice in Geordieland" – 3:03

Personnel
John Gallagher – bass, vocals
Mark Gallagher – guitar
Joe Hasselvander – drums

2015 albums
Raven (British band) albums
SPV/Steamhammer albums